Keiko Ihara (井原 慶子, Ihara Keiko) (born July 4, 1973) is a Japanese race car driver. She was a former race queen, a model who appears in a swimsuit or other fashionable apparel at race circuits, before deciding to become a racing driver. She is one of the few Japanese women nationals to race internationally at a high level. Her best finishes in the British Formula Three Championship are two 8th places finishes in 2005, which helped her to a final championship standing position of 16th with 12 points. In the 2006 series, she finished in 17th and last position in the Championship Class, with 4 points.

Ihara joined the Gulf Racing Middle East to compete at the FIA World Endurance Championship in the LMP2 class with Jean-Denis Délétraz and Fabien Giroix as codrivers. In 2013, she raced two rounds for Gulf Racing Middle East and four with OAK Racing, both in the LMP2 class. The driver won the Fuji round of the 2014 Asian Le Mans Series for Oak Racing, together with Ho-Pin Tung and David Cheng.

Racing record

Career summary

 Season still in progress. † – Charity race guest.

24 Hours of Le Mans results

Complete FIA World Endurance Championship results

IMSA WeatherTech SportsCar Championship series results

* Season still in progress

External links
  
 

1973 births
Living people
Sportspeople from Tokyo
Japanese racing drivers
Japanese female racing drivers
French Formula Three Championship drivers
British Formula Three Championship drivers
Formula BMW Asia drivers
European Le Mans Series drivers
FIA World Endurance Championship drivers
24 Hours of Le Mans drivers
Asian Le Mans Series drivers
WeatherTech SportsCar Championship drivers
Carlin racing drivers

Signature Team drivers
OAK Racing drivers
Eurasia Motorsport drivers
Team Aguri drivers
Larbre Compétition drivers